Anastasia Acosta (born Anastasia Magdalena Acosta Loría on October 18, 1974) is a Mexican actress and model.

Life

Born in San José, Costa Rica, Anastasia started her career in the modeling world and came to the attention of Mexican producers. She was invited to stay in Mexico to star as a game show model in the Mexican version of "Wheel of Fortune" ("La Rueda de la Fortuna"). Shortly after, the actor and producer Jorge Ortiz de Pinedo invited her to co-host the program "Humor es los Comediantes". Anastasia became well known for her roles in television comedy, particularly the television series "Cero en Conducta". She then moved on to play antagonist roles in several soap operas.

Filmography

Theater
 Quiero pero no puedo (Teatro Insurgentes)
 El show de la escuelita (Teatro blanquita)
 Busco al hombre de mi vida, marido ya tuve (Teatro Arlequín/Teatro Ofelia)

References

External links

1975 births
Living people
Mexican telenovela actresses
Mexican television actresses
Mexican film actresses
Mexican stage actresses
Mexican female models
Actresses from San José, Costa Rica
Costa Rican female models
20th-century Mexican actresses
21st-century Mexican actresses
Costa Rican emigrants to Mexico
People from San José, Costa Rica
Costa Rican film actresses
Costa Rican stage actresses
Costa Rican television actresses